Win, Lose or Draw (also known as Disney's Win, Lose or Draw) is a game show that aired as a preview on January 17, 2014, and officially premiered on March 3 on Disney Channel.

In April 2013, the Disney Channel announced a new version of Win, Lose or Draw, to be hosted by Justin Willman. As with Teen Win, Lose or Draw, the two teams on each program are made up of two young contestants plus a teenage celebrity (this time, from a Disney Channel or Disney XD program). New motion-control technology is featured. Jennifer Convy, daughter of original series co-creator Bert Convy, serves as the executive producer. Since the season finale aired on May 21, 2014, no news sources have indicated that Win, Lose or Draw was renewed for a second season.

Challenges
The 2014 version featured the following rounds (all 90 seconds):

Get a Clue: For each word, two team members work on a drawing while the third guesses. The host announces a clue, leading to the answer, with additional clues provided and the two artists alternate working on a drawing every 10 seconds. Each right answer is worth 10 points, with team members alternating after each word is either guessed or passed.

Draw-Obstacle Course: The clue givers endure a variety of challenges while drawing, such as using an over-sized stylus, drawing on a spinning touch-screen board, the current drawing disappearing if the clue giver lifts his/her finger, or drawing while standing on a vibrating stool. The challenges rotate from episode to episode, and three are presented per round. As before, right answers are worth 10 points.

Fill in the Blank: Adapted from the original final round, Willman reads a pun-styled clue with a blank, with the clue-giver drawing the word that filled in the blank. As in all previous versions, the team that was trailing goes first (or the team that went first in round one going first if the score was tied), and clues are worth 20 points, with as many clues played as possible within the time limit.

Prize Round: The winning contestants paired up with both of the day's guest stars to win up to four prizes. Four words or phrases were played, each right guess earning a prize which the contestants picked out from four boxes on stage. Three different bonus round games were played:
The Wand: Most frequently played, each artist faces away from the video wall and drew a picture in the air, using a hand-held wand, which is transmitted to the video wall for their teammates to guess. If an artist turns around to look at the wall, they are disqualified.
Follow Your Art: Similar to the "Get a Clue" round, the artist starts drawing on one screen and every five seconds the drawing will "swoop" to one of the other two screens.
Sit & Spin: The artist sits in a rotating chair and try to draw the word/phrase while the chair rotates, without standing up.

Episodes

Broadcast

The series originally aired as a preview on January 17, 2014, and officially premiered on March 3, 2014, on Disney Channel. Family Channel premiered it on April 7, 2014, and Disney Channel (UK and Ireland) premiered on May 5, 2014. Eventually it premiered on May 30, 2014, on Disney Channel (Asia) and on June 2, 2014, on Disney Channel (Australia and New Zealand). In late June 2014, the series premiered on Disney Channel (Europe, Middle East and Africa).

References

External links
 

2010s American children's game shows
2014 American television series debuts
2014 American television series endings
Disney Channel original programming
Television series by Disney